Vlado Chernozemski (Bulgarian: Владо Черноземски; born Velichko Dimitrov Kerin, ; 19 October 1897 – 9 October 1934), was a Bulgarian revolutionary. Also known as "Vlado the Chauffeur", Chernozemski is considered a hero in Bulgaria today, and in his time, in Croat dissident circles and in the Macedonian Bulgarian diaspora. The official  historiography in North Macedonia regards him as a controversial Bulgarian.

Chernozemski began his revolutionary activities in 1922, when he joined the Internal Macedonian Revolutionary Organization (IMRO). Soon after, he became an assassin for the IMRO. He killed two notable Bulgarian politicians, communist Dimo Hadzhidimov, and IMRO member Naum Tomalevski. Both times he was sentenced to death, but he escaped from his first imprisonment and was released from the second. After his release in 1932, he became an instructor for the Ustaše. He trained a group of three Ustaše to assassinate Alexander of Yugoslavia, but eventually killed Alexander himself on 9 October 1934 in Marseille. He was then beaten by French police and spectators, and died the same day. French Foreign Minister Louis Barthou was also killed by a stray bullet fired by French police during the scuffle following the attack.

For murdering King Alexander I, Chernozemski was posthumously declared the most dangerous terrorist in Europe.

Early life

Velichko Dimitrov Kerin was born in the village of Kamenitsa, then in the Principality of Bulgaria, now a quarter of the town of Velingrad. His father, Dimitar Kerin, and his mother, Risa Baltadzieva, were both local peasants. He received primary education in his native village. His mother died when he was 14 years old and the young Kerin was induced to help his father feed the family along with his younger brother and two sisters. Chernozemski joined the military in Plovdiv. During World War I, he served in the engineer corps. After the war he worked as a driver and watchmaker. As a youngster, he was prone to drinking alcohol, but later reformed and became a vegetarian. He married in 1919. In 1923, his daughter Latinka was born. In 1925, he divorced and remarried. He lived in Sofia until 1932. According to a conspiracy theory promoted by himself, he was born in a village called Patrick near Štip, that was burned down by the Serbian army during the Second Balkan War, and was never restored. His mother and father were therefore living in Bulgaria as refugees. He used different aliases and pseudonyms such as Vlado Georgiev Chernozemski, Peter Kelemen, Vlado the Chauffeur, Rudolph Suk, Vladimir Dimitrov Vladimirov etc. Even his second wife didn't know his real name, or anything about his past. There are no records of him in Bulgaria beyond 1932, but he was re-identified in 1934, after his death in France.

Revolutionary activity

IMRO
A legend describing Chernozemski as Vlado the Driver appeared in Macedonia, since he worked for a company in Dupnitsa as a driver for a short time.  In the early 1920s, he moved to Bansko, when the Internal Macedonian Revolutionary Organization (IMRO) was re-established by Todor Alexandrov. Chernozemski joined the IMRO in 1922 in the unit Voivode Ivan Barlyo. From 1923 to 1924, he was a member of Trayan Lakavishki's cheta. Chernozemski also entered the region of Vardar Macedonia with IMRO bands and participated in more than 15 skirmishes with Yugoslav police He soon became one of the best marksmen in the organization, known for his courage, sangfroid and discipline.

Assassin of the IMRO

In 1925 Ivan Mihailov became the new leader of the IMRO. In this period the organization took actions against the former left-wing activists, assassinating several of them. Mihailov assigned Chernozemski to assassinate MP Dimo Hadzhidimov, a member of the Communist Party of Bulgaria and former IMRO member. Chernozemski was arrested and sentenced to death by hanging for Hadzhidimov's assassination, but his execution was never carried out. In 1925, Chernozemski escaped from a police escort.

In 1927, Chernozemski proposed to the IMRO Central Committee to enter the main conference building of the League of Nations in Paris and detonate grenades attached to his person, in order to attract the attention of the world and generate publicity over the question of the Bulgarians in Macedonia, but his proposal was rejected. In 1929, the leadership of the IMRO called on Ante Pavelić and the Ustaše for cooperation.

In 1930, Chernozemski, following an order by Mihailov, assassinated another member of the IMRO, Naum Tomalevski, and his bodyguard. Tomalevski had been a prominent member of the IMRO. For the second time, Chernozemski was sentenced to death, but he was pardoned in 1932.

Killing of King Alexander

After his release from the prison, Chernozemski disappeared. He moved to Italy, where he became an instructor for the Ustaše in a camp in Borgotaro. He was then transferred to the Ustaše camp in Janka-Puszta, near Nagykanizsa in Hungary. The main purpose of this camp was planning for the assassination of King Alexander I. Chernozemski was the instructor of the group of three Ustašas: Mijo Kralj, Zvonimir Pospišil, and Ivan Raić, who were preparing to assassinate the king. On September 29, the four terrorists arrived in Paris, and on October 6 they split into two groups. Chernozemski and Kralj moved to Marseille, where the king was expected to arrive on October 9, and Pospišil and Raić, moved to Versailles where they planned a second attack in case of failure of the first one. On 9 October 1934, Chernozemski carried out the murder, after concluding that the other members of the group were unprepared psychologically.

As King Alexander's motorcade drove at a few miles per hour down a Marseille street in front of an adoring crowd, Chernozemski emerged from the crowd, approached the king's car and leapt onto its running board while concealing his Mauser C96 semi-automatic pistol in a bouquet of flowers and chanting "Vive le roi" ("Long live the King"). He shot Alexander repeatedly, hitting him twice, once in the abdomen and the other in the heart; King Alexander died within minutes. The chauffeur—who tried to push Chernozemski off the car—and Alexander's companion in the car, French Foreign Minister Louis Barthou, were also shot. Chernozemski killed the chauffeur, apparently unintentionally. A police officer fired at Chernozemski but missed and fatally wounded Barthou. The chauffeur died almost immediately, with his foot pressed on the brake of the car, providing the opportunity for a photographer outside the car to photograph most of the grisly affair. Barthou might have survived, but did not, apparently because of inadequate medical attention.

After shooting a policeman who tried to seize him and inadvertently killing two bystanders, Chernozemski then futilely attempted to flee the scene but was struck by a slash from an escorting cavalryman's sabre, stunning him. He then received a non-mortal bullet wound in the head from a nearby police officer, and was fatally beaten by the enraged crowd while the police stood back and watched. Chernozemski was then brought in for interrogation. Since the assassin was in critical condition, he was unable to say anything and succumbed to his injuries later that evening, 10 days before his 37th birthday. The French police were unable to identify him; they could only register his tattoo, a skull with crossbones and a sign reading "V.M.R.O." (Bulgarian initials standing for Internal Macedonian Revolutionary Organization). He was buried in an unmarked grave in the Marseille cemeteries with only two detectives and the gravediggers present. A Yugoslav journalist who saw the tattoo told the press it was the symbol of the IMRO. In the night of October 10, the French police arrested in Paris the Ustaša terrorists Zvonimir Pospišil and Ivan Raić. Five days later Mijo Kralj was arrested, who admitted everything. As a result, an exhumation was organized and fingerprints were sent from Paris to Sofia and Belgrade. On 17 October it was officially announced from Bulgarian police that the killer was Vlado Chernozemski.

Gallery

Citations

External links

 
The King is Dead, Long Live the Balkans! Watching the Marseilles Murders by Keith Brown - The Watson Institute for International Studies

1897 births
1934 deaths
People from Velingrad
Regicides
Bulgarian nationalist assassins
Bulgarian assassins
Deaths by beating in Europe
Bulgarian revolutionaries
Bulgarian people of World War I
Bulgarian prisoners sentenced to death
Prisoners sentenced to death by Bulgaria
Bulgarian people convicted of murder
People convicted of murder by Bulgaria
Deaths in police custody in France
Members of the Internal Macedonian Revolutionary Organization
Articles containing video clips
Bulgarian people murdered abroad
Bulgarian nationalists
Thracian Bulgarians
People from Pazardzhik Province
Murdered criminals